An intraventricular block is a heart conduction disorder —  heart block of the ventricles of the heart. An example is a right bundle branch block, right fascicular block, bifascicular block, trifascicular block.

Types 
Types of intraventricular blocks are

 Fascicular block 
Left anterior fascicular block
Left posterior fascicular block
 Trifascicular block
 Bifascicular block (RBBB with fascicular block)
 Right bundle branch block (RBBB)
 Left bundle branch block (LBBB)

Intraventricular conduction delay 

Intraventricular conduction delays (IVCD) are conduction disorders seen in intraventricular propagation of supraventricular impulses resulting in changes in the QRS complex duration or morphology, or both. IVCD can be caused by abnormalities in the structures of bundle of His, Purkinje fibers or ventricular myocardium. Nonspecific intraventricular conduction delay (NICD) is a delay with widened QRS complex but without a specific intraventricular block present.

References

Further reading

External links 

 Intraventricular conduction delay overview at Wikidoc
 Conduction defects at ECGWaves
 Nonspecific intraventricular conduction delay (NSIVCD) at ECGWaves

Cardiac arrhythmia